Vozdvizhenka may refer to:
Vozdvizhenka Street, a street in Moscow, Russia
Vozdvizhenka (air base), an air base in Primorsky Krai, Russia
Vozdvizhenka (rural locality), name of several rural localities in Russia